Labrisomus pomaspilus is a species of labrisomid blenny only known from the Pacific coast in the area of Esmeraldas, Ecuador and from some locations in Colombia.  This species is known to be a tide pool denizen.  A female of the species measured  SL.

References

pomaspilus
Fish described in 1965
Taxa named by Victor G. Springer
Taxa named by Richard Heinrich Rosenblatt